Owen de Abrew (born 22 April 1920, date of death unknown) was one of Sri Lanka's leading ballroom dance personalities, he was known as the 'King of Ballroom dancing' in Colombo.

Fifty Years in Ballroom Dancing in Sri Lanka 
De Abrew, who celebrated 50 years in Ballroom Dancing, was felicitated in Colombo by the Ballroom Dancers Federation of Sri Lanka in August 1994. He started his dance career under the guidance of Carl Cooke and won his first Ballroom Dance Championship in Colombo in 1952, at the National Ballroom Open Event. He started teaching dance as a career in 1954. De Abrew has taught the waltz or foxtrot and Latin dances such as cha cha and rumba, among other dance forms to thousands in Sri Lanka.

Presenter of music programs on Radio Ceylon 
Own de Abrew was also a guest presenter of many radio programs in the late 1950s and 1960s, over the airwaves of Radio Ceylon. He presented a popular radio programme called The Ballroom of the Air. The station ruled the airwaves in South Asia and millions tuned in to hear Radio Ceylon. Owen de Abrew brought with him a flair and creativity to English radio programmes on the Station. He continued giving his input when Radio Ceylon became the Sri Lanka Broadcasting Corporation. De Abrew worked very closely with broadcasting legends Livy Wijemanne and Vernon Corea at Radio Ceylon throughout the 1950s and 1960s.

Ballroom Dance Awards 
The National Association of Dancing of the UK awarded Owen de Abrew a medal for outstanding contribution to Ballroom Dancing in Sri Lanka in 1989 and Owen de Abrew received this award from John Dilroy who was the UK's Ten Dance Champion, Fellow and Examiner of the Imperial Society.

Two of de Abrew's students represented Sri Lanka at the World Championships in the United States in 1988. Owen de Abrew has handed the ballroom dance mantle to his son Ravi de Abrew who is a dance champion in his own right in Sri Lanka.

See also
Vernon Corea
Radio Ceylon
Sri Lanka Broadcasting Corporation
List of Sri Lankan broadcasters

References

External links 
 Owen de Abrew felicitated - TV Times, Sunday Times, Sri Lanka
 Golden Felicitation Bash - Owen de Abrew Sunday Observer Feature
 Dancing All the Way - Ravi de Abrew
 Dance teacher par excellence - Sunday Times, Sri Lanka
 Senior Dance Professional - Daily News, Sri Lanka 
 Dancing His Cares Away - Sunday Observer, Sri Lanka

1920 births
Year of death unknown
Ballroom dancers
Sri Lankan male dancers
Sri Lankan radio personalities